City Group of Colleges  is a group of schools located in Lucknow, Uttar Pradesh. It was established in 2005 under the patronage of Rajendra Prasad Society. It is registered under the Societies Registration Act, 1860. It is affiliated to Lucknow University and Dr. A.P.J. Abdul Kalam Technical University. It has four branches in Lucknow, each situated at Chinhut, Jankipuram Extension, Barabanki and Ratankhand.

References

External links
http://www.cgclko.com
https://web.archive.org/web/20170810121450/http://www.lkouniv.ac.in/list_of_colleges.html

Law schools in Uttar Pradesh
Educational institutions established in 2005
2005 establishments in Uttar Pradesh